Teem was a brand of lemon-lime-flavored soft drink produced by The Pepsi-Cola Company. It was introduced in 1959 as Pepsi's answer to 7 Up and Sprite.

Overview 
In the pre-planning stages, Teem was known as “Duet”, however due to a potential copyright dispute with Swift’s, a food manufacturer with a margarine carrying the same brand, the name was changed before marketing could begin. On April 10, 1959, three Pepsi-Cola representatives from Chicago, New York, and San Francisco converged on St. Joseph, Missouri to give the public the first taste of the new drink, as the city was chosen for Teem’s primary distribution market before being shipped elsewhere. Three days later, on the following Monday, advertisements cropped up in area newspapers advertising the drink as being for sale in stores.
Teem was sold in the United States and Canada until it was discontinued in 1984 due to declining sales. Lemon-Lime Slice was introduced to replace Teem, though it was still available at some soda fountains into the 1990s. Later, Sierra Mist, and then Starry, became Pepsi's lemon-lime soda offerings in the US. 

By the 1990s, Teem was available almost all over the country. However, in Japan, South Korea, and several other countries Teem is almost absent and replaced with Mirinda lemon lime or their respective national brands as in South Korea by Lotte under the name Chilsung Cider, in Japan by Asahi Soft Drinks under the name Mitsuya Cider, and in Turkey by Tamek under the name Fruko which companies are close associates of Pepsico. Teem remains on sale today in Brazil, Uruguay, Honduras, Nepal, Nigeria, India, Pakistan, and South Africa; it survived into the 1990s in other markets, too, before Pepsi authorized vendors to replace it with rival brand 7up due to the sale of 7up International (excluding the US) to Pepsi by Philip Morris. Pepsi has a lemon lime soda monopoly in several countries by selling 7up and Teem together.

Notes

References

Products introduced in 1960
Lemon-lime sodas
PepsiCo brands
PepsiCo soft drinks
1984 disestablishments in the United States